Alejandro Berber Castañón (born August 3, 1987, in Monterrey, Nuevo León) is a former professional Mexican footballer who currently plays for Alebrijes de Oaxaca.

External links
 

Living people
1987 births
Association football midfielders
Club Puebla players
C.F. Monterrey players
Guerreros de Hermosillo F.C. footballers
Leones Negros UdeG footballers
C.D. Veracruz footballers
Correcaminos UAT footballers
Club Atlético Zacatepec players
FC Juárez footballers
Venados F.C. players
Alebrijes de Oaxaca players
Liga MX players
Ascenso MX players
Liga Premier de México players
Footballers from Nuevo León
Sportspeople from Monterrey
Pan American Games bronze medalists for Mexico
Medalists at the 2007 Pan American Games
Footballers at the 2007 Pan American Games
Pan American Games medalists in football
Mexican footballers